Harpalus praticola is a species of ground beetle in the subfamily Harpalinae. It was described by Henry Walter Bates in 1891.

References

praticola
Beetles described in 1891